Asomante may refer to:

Places
Asomante, Aguada, Puerto Rico, a barrio
Asomante, Aibonito, Puerto Rico, a barrio